William Warfield Wilson (March 2, 1868 – July 22, 1942) was a U.S. Representative from Illinois.

Biography
Born in Ohio, Illinois, Wilson attended public schools, and the University of Michigan at Ann Arbor. He graduated from the Chicago-Kent College of Law in 1893. He was admitted to the bar the same year and commenced practice in Chicago, Illinois.

Wilson was elected as a Republican to the Fifty-eighth and to the four succeeding Congresses (March 4, 1903 – March 3, 1913). He was not successful as candidate for election in 1912 to the Sixty-third Congress.

Wilson was elected to the Sixty-fourth, Sixty-fifth, and Sixty-sixth Congresses (March 4, 1915 – March 3, 1921). He was not a candidate for renomination in 1920

He was appointed general counsel of the Office of Alien Property Custodian of the United States Department of Justice in 1922, serving until 1927. In a memorandum written in 1924, Wilson condemned "acts of spoliation" that occurred in 1919-1920, first, under the watch of A. Mitchell Palmer, and then — his successor, Francis Patrick Garvan, 

After retiring from the Office of Alien Property Custodian, Wilsone resumed the practice of law. He died in Chicago, and was interred in Union Cemetery in Ohio, Illinois.

Family
Wilson married Sarah M. Moore in 1892 and they had one son, Stephen Askew Wilson (1896-1987).

References

1868 births
1942 deaths
Politicians from Chicago
University of Michigan alumni
Republican Party members of the United States House of Representatives from Illinois